Ribbesford House is a historic English mansion in Bewdley, Worcestershire. With a history dating back a thousand years, the house is a Grade II* listed building with architectural elements ranging from the 16th to the 19th century.

Description

The house has 20 bedrooms, 10 reception rooms and nine bathrooms on three storeys. The building has two octagonal turrets. The property includes a cottage, outbuildings, and eight acres of land with gardens and a woodland.

There is a description of Ribbesford House in the Pevsner Architectural Guide for Worcestershire (1968), detailing its various elements dating from the 16th century (ceiling oak beams) to the 19th century.

History

An Anglo-Saxon charter from the early 11th century mentions that the estate was given by Bishop Wulfstan to his sister. It was seized by the Danes, then regained by the monks, only to be captured by Turstin the Fleming. In 1074 the estate was presented to Ralph de Mortimer in recognition of his services to William the Conqueror. The house seems to have been rebuilt around 1535, when the turrets were probably added. Around the same time, John Leland called it a "goodly manour place."

Ribbesford House remained in the Mortimer family until the early 17th century, when it passed to Baron Herbert of Cherbury, whose coat of arms still stands at the property. The correspondence of his son Henry with Oliver Cromwell, Queen of Bohemia and other contemporaries was discovered in one of the towers. Parts of the house were renovated in 1669. The estate was purchased in 1787 by Francis Ingram, who demolished the larger part of the house.

The visitors to Ribbesford House included Bewdley-born prime minister Stanley Baldwin and his cousin writer Rudyard Kipling. The mansion was used to train Free French soldiers during World War II, when 211 French soldiers stayed at the property. Charles de Gaulle is believed to have regularly visited them there. About a third of the soldiers were later killed in the war. The house was also used as the headquarters of the British 18th Infantry Division, by American military, and for Polish and Italian prisoners of war. The property was bought in 1947 by RAF Wing Commander Alfred John Howell, who converted it into private apartments.

Ribbesford House was Grade II* listed in 1952 (Entry Number 1329928). At the time, it was described as a "Country house, now flats. Mid-C16, partly rebuilt late C17, remodelled early C19 with some mid-C20 alterations". The 1968 Pevsner’s guide, The Buildings of England: Worcestershire, included the house an property in its coverage.

In 2018, Howell's daughter Merryn placed the estate for sale by auction with a guide price of £500,000. It was purchased for £810,000 by brothers Samuel & Russell Leeds. They planned to restore the building to its original character. Restoration work began but the building proved to be in a worse condition than they had expected. Their £1 million restoration budget had to be doubled to £2 million. 

In 2021 Historic England placed Ribbesford House on its at risk register. Footage filmed in August 2022 revealed that restoration work had temporarily halted. However, as of October 2022 work had restarted.

See also
Ribbesford parish

References

External link
Ribbesford House at British Listed Buildings

Grade II* listed buildings in Worcestershire
Country houses in Worcestershire
Bewdley